Blaise is a personal name (from Greek Βλασιος, the name of Saint Blaise) and a place name. It can refer to:

People and fictional characters 
 Blaise (name), including lists of people and fictional characters with the given name or surname

Places

France 
 Blaise-sous-Arzillières, a village and commune in the Marne département of north-eastern France
 Blaise, a former commune of the Ardennes département, now part of Vouziers
 Blaise, a former commune of the Haute-Marne département, now part of Colombey-les-Deux-Églises
 Blaise (Marne), a tributary of the Marne River, northeastern France
 Blaise (Eure), a tributary of the Eure (river), northern France

Switzerland 
 Gate of Blaise, an ancient city gate in Basel

United Kingdom 
 Blaise Castle, a stately home in what is now the city of Bristol, England
 Blaise Hamlet, built about 1811 for retired employees of the owner of Blaise Castle
 Blaise High School, Bristol, England

See also 
 Blaise reaction, a type of chemical reaction
 Blaise ketone synthesis, a specific chemical reaction
 Cirey-sur-Blaise, a village and commune in the Haute-Marne département of north-eastern France
 Courcelles-sur-Blaise, a village and commune in the Haute-Marne département 
 Guindrecourt-sur-Blaise, a village and commune in the Haute-Marne département 
 Montreuil-sur-Blaise, a village and commune in the Haute-Marne département 
 Vaux-sur-Blaise, a village and commune in the Haute-Marne département 
 Wassy-sur-Blaise, a commune of the Haute-Marne département 
 Blais, a surname
 Blasius (disambiguation)
 Blaize (given name)
 Blaize (surname)